Fujiwara no Kenshi may refer to:

 Fujiwara no Kenshi (daughter of Michinaga) (994–1027), empress consort of Emperor Sanjō
  (1050–1133), wet nurse of Emperor Horikawa
 Fujiwara no Kenshi (daughter of Morozane) (1057–1084), empress consort of Emperor Shirakawa
  (1155–1229), wet nurse of Emperor Go-Toba